Mordellistena tenuis is a species of beetle in the genus Mordellistena of the family Mordellidae. It was described by Fairmaire in 1892.

References

External links
Coleoptera. BugGuide.

Beetles described in 1892
tenuis